C-type lectin domain family 7 member A or Dectin-1 is a protein that in humans is encoded by the CLEC7A gene. CLEC7A is a member of the C-type lectin/C-type lectin-like domain (CTL/CTLD) superfamily. The encoded glycoprotein is a small type II membrane receptor with an extracellular C-type lectin-like domain fold and a cytoplasmic domain with a partial immunoreceptor tyrosine-based activation motif. It functions as a pattern-recognition receptor for a variety of β-1,3-linked and β-1,6-linked glucans from fungi and plants, and in this way plays a role in innate immune response. Expression is found on myeloid dendritic cells, monocytes, macrophages and B cells. Alternate transcriptional splice variants, encoding different isoforms, have been characterized. This gene is closely linked to other CTL/CTLD superfamily members on chromosome 12p13 in the natural killer gene complex region.

Structure 
Dectin-1 is a transmembrane protein containing an immunoreceptor tyrosine-based activation (ITAM)-like motif in its intracellular tail (which is involved in cellular activation) and one C-type lectin-like domain (carbohydrate-recognition domain, CRD) in the extracellular region (which recognizes β-glucans and endogenous ligands on T cells). The CRD is separated from the membrane by a stalk region. CLEC7A contains putative sites of N-linked glycosylation in the stalk region.

CLEC7A is expressed by macrophages, neutrophils and dendritic cells. Expression has also been studied on other immune cells including eosinophils and B cells.

Function 
The C-type lectin receptors are class of signalling pattern recognition receptors which are involved in antifungal immunity, but also play important roles in immune responses to other pathogens such as bacteria, viruses and nematodes. As a member of this receptor family, dectin-1 recognizes β-glucans and carbohydrates found in fungal cell walls, some bacteria and plants, but may also recognize other unidentified molecules (endogenous ligand on T-cells and ligand on mycobacteria). Ligand binding induces intracellular signalling via the ITAM-like motif. CLEC7A can induce both Syk dependent or Syk independent pathways. Dimerization of dectin-1 upon ligand binding leads to tyrosine phosphorylation by Src family kinases and recruitment of Syk. Upon Syk recruitment is PKC-δ activated, which subsequently phosphorylates CARD9 that triggers recruitment of BCL10 and MALT1, leading to a CARD-CC/BCL10/MALT1 (CBM) signaling complex. This signaling complex in turn triggers downstream recruitment of TRAF6 and NF-κB activation. This transcription factor is responsible for the production of numerous inflammatory cytokines and chemokines such as TNF, IL-23, IL-6, IL-2. Other responses include: respiratory burst, production of arachidonic acid metabolites, dendritic cell maturation, and phagocytosis of the ligand.

Antifungal immunity
CLEC7A has been shown to recognize species of several fungal genera, including Saccharomyces, Candida, Pneumocystis, Coccidioides, Penicillium and others. Recognition of these organisms triggers many protective pathways, such as fungal uptake by phagocytosis and killing via hypochlorite generation. Activation of dectin-1 also triggers expression of many protecting antifungal cytokines and chemokines (TNF, CXCL2, IL-1β, IL-1α, CCL3, GM-CSF, G-CSF and IL-6) and the development of Th17.

Histoplasma capsulatum can evade recognition of β-glucan via CLEC7A on phagocytic cells by secreting an enzyme that removes exposed β-glucans or by masking the β-glucan with α-glucan.

Co-stimulatory molecule 
Also operating as a co-stimulatory molecule via recognition of an endogenous ligand on T-cells, which leads to cellular activation and proliferation, CLEC7A can bind both CD4+ and CD8+ T cells.

References

External links

Further reading 

 
 
 
 
 
 
 
 
 
 
 
 
 
 
 
 
 

C-type lectins